Pitcairnia dendroidea is a species of flowering plant in the Bromeliaceae family. It is native to Ecuador.

References

dendroidea
Flora of Ecuador
Taxa named by Édouard André